The 2013 AFC U-22 Championship was an age restricted association football tournament that took place during January 2014 in Oman. It was the first U-22 age group competition organised by the Asian Football Confederation.

Each nation was required to name 23 players in their national team squad. The full squad listings are below.

Group A

Jordan
Head coach: Islam Thyabat

Myanmar
Head coach:  Gerd Zeise

Oman

Head coach: Philippe Burle

South Korea

Head coach: Lee Kwang-jong

Group B

North Korea

Head coach: Hwang Yong Bong

Syria

Head coach: Ahmad Al Shaar

United Arab Emirates

Head coach: Ali Ebrahim Ali Abdulla Hasan

Yemen

Head coach: Abraham Gebreslassie

Group C

Australia

Head coach: Aurelio Vidmar

Iran

Head coach: Human Afazeli

Japan

Head coach: Makoto Teguramori

Kuwait

Head coach: Jorvan Vieira

Group D

China

Head coach: Fu Bo

Saudi Arabia

Head coach: Khalid Al-Koroni

Iraq

Head coach: Hakeem Shaker

Uzbekistan

Head coach: Shukhrat Maksudov

References

2013 AFC U-22 Championship